The following highways are numbered 525:

Australia
  Arthurs Lake Road, Tasmania
  Stanley Road, Victoria

Belgium
 N525 road

Canada
  Alberta Highway 525
  Manitoba Provincial Road 525
  New Brunswick Route 525
  Ontario Highway 525

Ireland
 R525 regional road

United States
  Florida State Road 525 (former)
  Kentucky Route 525
  Louisiana Highway 525
  New Mexico State Road 525
 Texas
  Farm to Market Road 525
  Puerto Rico Highway 525
  Washington State Route 525